Watchout! is the fourth studio album and fifth album overall by Martha and the Vandellas, released on the Gordy (Motown) label in 1966. The album included the top 10 hit singles, "I'm Ready for Love" and "Jimmy Mack" and the ballad single, "What Am I Gonna Do Without Your Love?".  This was one of the last albums by the group with songs by Holland–Dozier–Holland who, the following year, left Motown, and with William "Mickey" Stevenson, who helped put the group on the musical map. The title of the album was derived from a song on the B-side of their hit single "My Baby Loves Me" (released earlier in 1966) entitled "Never Leave Your Baby's Side" (never released on an album). That song's chorus warned to "Watchout!" for "other girls" who could steal your man.

Track listing

Personnel
Martha Reeves – lead vocals
Rosalind Ashford – backing vocals (except on "Let This Day Be")
Betty Kelly – backing vocals (except "Let This Day Be" and "Jimmy Mack")
Annette Beard – backing vocals on "Jimmy Mack"
The Andantes – backing vocals on "Let This Day Be" and "Happiness is Guaranteed"; additional background vocals on "Jimmy Mack", "I'm Ready for Love" and "Tell Me I'll Never Be Alone"
The Spinners – backing vocals on "I'll Follow You"
The Funk Brothers – instrumentation

References

External links 
 Martha and the Vandellas - Watchout! (1966) album review by Bruce Eder, credits & releases at AllMusic
 Martha and the Vandellas - Watchout! (1966) album releases & credits at Discogs
 Martha and the Vandellas - Watchout! (1966) album to be listened on Spotify
 Martha and the Vandellas - Watchout! (1966) album to be listened on YouTube

1966 albums
Gordy Records albums
Martha and the Vandellas albums
Albums produced by Harvey Fuqua
Albums produced by Smokey Robinson
Albums produced by William "Mickey" Stevenson
Albums produced by Brian Holland
Albums produced by Lamont Dozier
Albums recorded at Hitsville U.S.A.
Albums produced by Edward Holland Jr.